Mohamed Salah Ibrahim Abo Gresha (born 11 January 1970) is an Egyptian former footballer who played as a striker. He is one of the most popular players to play for Egyptian club Ismaily. He won 4 titles out of 6 titles Ismaily won through history. He was the Egyptian League top scorer for the 1995–96 season.

Biography
Mohamed Salah is the nephew of Ali Abo Gresha, the brother's son. He started playing with Ismaily.

Honours
Egyptian League Top Scorer (1995/1996)
Scored 86 goals in
Scored 15 Goals in Egyptian Cup
Scored 6 Goals in African Club Cups
Scored 2 Goals in Arab Club Cups

Previous Clubs
Tadamon (Kuwait)
Sawahel "Border Guards" (Egypt)
Ismaily (Egypt)

Played for Egyptian National Team in
Olympic Games 1992
African Cup of Nations in 1992, 1994 & 1996 (2 games)

4 Titles for Ismaily 
2 Egyptian League titles (1990/91 & 2001/02)
2 Egyptian Cup titles (1996/97 & 1999/00)

References

External links

1970 births
Living people
Egyptian footballers
Association football forwards
Ismaily SC players
Haras El Hodoud SC players
Al Tadhamon SC players
Egyptian Premier League players
Egypt international footballers
Competitors at the 1991 Mediterranean Games
Footballers at the 1992 Summer Olympics
Olympic footballers of Egypt
1992 African Cup of Nations players
1996 African Cup of Nations players
Egyptian expatriate footballers
Egyptian expatriate sportspeople in Kuwait
Expatriate footballers in Kuwait
Mediterranean Games competitors for Egypt
Kuwait Premier League players